Coghlan is an anglicisation of the Irish surname Ó Coghláin which means "descendant of Coghlán" or Mac Coghláin which means "son of Coghlán". Notable people with the surname include:

Charles F. Coghlan (actor, born 1896) (1896–1972), American actor and writer
Charles Francis Coghlan (1842–1899), Anglo-Irish actor and playwright
Charles Coghlan (politician) (1863–1927), South Africa-born lawyer and politician who served as Premier of Southern Rhodesia
Chris Coghlan (born 1985), American baseball player
Dylan Coghlan (born 1998), Canadian ice hockey player
Eamonn Coghlan (born 1952), Irish track and field athlete
Jeremiah Coghlan (c. 1776–1844), Royal Navy officer
John Coghlan (disambiguation)
Joseph Coghlan (1844–1908), U.S. Navy rear admiral
Junior Coghlan (1916-2009), American actor
Monica Coghlan (1951–2001), English prostitute involved in a political scandal
Paul Coghlan (born 1944), Irish Fine Gael politician
Rose Coghlan (1851–1932), English actress

Surnames of Irish origin
Anglicised Irish-language surnames